Plumbago indica, the Indian leadwort, scarlet leadwort or whorled plantain,  is a species of flowering plant in the family Plumbaginaceae, native to Southeast Asia, Indonesia, the Philippines, and Yunnan in southern China.

It produces racemes of deep pink or scarlet flowers in winter.

Plumbago indica is cultivated as an ornamental plant.

It has gained the Royal Horticultural Society's Award of Garden Merit.

References

indica
Flora of Indo-China
Flora of Malesia
Flora of Yunnan
Garden plants of Asia
Taxa named by Carl Linnaeus
Poisonous plants